Bruce McLeod Sharp (24 March 1931 – 12 January 2023) was an Australian gymnast. He competed in eight events at the 1956 Summer Olympics.

Sharp died on 12 January 2023, at the age of 91.

References

1931 births
2023 deaths
Australian male artistic gymnasts
Olympic gymnasts of Australia
Gymnasts at the 1956 Summer Olympics
Place of birth missing